The 2015–16 Premier League of Bosnia and Herzegovina, also known as BH Telecom Premier League for sponsorship reasons, is the sixteenth season of the Premier League of Bosnia and Herzegovina, the highest football league of Bosnia and Herzegovina, since its original establishment in 2000 and fourteenth as a unified country-wide league. The league began 25 July 2015 and will end 14 May 2016, with a winter break between 7 December 2015 and 27 February 2016. The official fixture schedule was released on 10 July 2015. In the 2015–16 season, six teams will be relegated as the league decided to reduce the number of participants from the current 16 to 12 for the 2016–17 season.

The 2015–16 season will see the return of FK Rudar Prijedor and newcomer FK Mladost Doboj Kakanj to top flight as promoted teams, in place of FK Mladost Velika Obarska who returns to Prva liga RS after two seasons in top flight and NK Zvijezda Gradačac who were relegated to the Prva liga FBiH after spending 7 seasons in the Premier League of Bosnia and Herzegovina. Sarajevo are the defending champions.

Teams 

A total of 16 teams will contest the league, including the top 14 sides from the 2014-15 season and two promoted sides from each of the second-level leagues.

Stadiums and locations

Personnel and kits

Note: Flags indicate national team as has been defined under FIFA eligibility rules. Players and Managers may hold more than one non-FIFA nationality.

League table

Positions by round

Results

Clubs season-progress

Top goalscorers

References

External links 
Official site for the Football Federation of Bosnia and Herzegovina
soccerway.com

2015-16
Bosnia
1